Enforcement is a 2020 Danish crime action film directed by Frederik Louis Hviid and Anders Ølholm in their feature directorial debut. The film premiered at the 77th Venice International Film Festival in the 35th International Critics' Week on 5 September 2020, and it is about two patrol officers who find themselves trapped when unrest spreads after news arrives that a young foreigner of the ghetto has died while in police custody.

Plot
Jens Høyer (Simon Sears) and Mike Andersen are officer on routine patrol in the ghetto of Svalegården, a fictional neighborhood of Copenhagen. The mood among the foreign population is heated because an arrested Senegalese, 19-year-old Talib Ben Hassi, was seriously injured in police custody and is in danger of life. Subsequently, when the death of the young Talib is made known, the two agents, engaged in a search, are attacked and their car is set on fire. Jens and Mike will then have to survive the ghetto people's desire for revenge.

Production
Shorta is an Arabic word for police.

Release
The film had its world premiere at the 77th Venice International Film Festival in the 35th International Critics' Week on 5 September 2020. It had a Danish theatrical release on 8 October 2020. It had a limited theatrical release in North America by Magnolia Pictures and was released on VOD by Magnet Releasing on 19 March 2021. It was internationally released on 4 June 2021.

Reception

Box office
Enforcement grossed $0 in North America, and a worldwide total of $53,189.

Critical response
On review aggregator Rotten Tomatoes, the film holds an approval rating of 83% based on 29 reviews, with an average rating of 6.5/10. The website's consensus reads, "What Enforcement lacks in character development, this propulsive action thriller makes up with a smart script and relentless tension."
 
Joe Morgenstern found the physical action "more compelling than the superheated plot". Variety Peter Debruge praised the film as "gripping" and a "smart, nonstop thriller". Simon Abrams rated the film one and a half stars out of five in his review for RogerEbert.com.

References

External links 
 
 
 

2020 films
2020 crime action films
2020 directorial debut films
2020s Danish-language films
Danish crime action films
Films about police officers
Films about police misconduct
Films about race and ethnicity
Films set in Copenhagen